Sleepaway Camp II: Unhappy Campers (released as Nightmare Vacation II in the United Kingdom) is a 1988 American slasher film written by Fritz Gordon and directed by Michael A. Simpson. It is the second installment in the Sleepaway Camp film series, and stars Pamela Springsteen as Angela, and Renée Estevez. The film takes place five years after the events of the original, and features serial killer Angela, working as a counselor, murdering misbehaving teenagers at another summer camp.

Sleepaway Camp II: Unhappy Campers has elements of black comedy and references various horror franchises, such as Friday the 13th, A Nightmare on Elm Street, and The Texas Chainsaw Massacre.

It was followed by a direct sequel, Sleepaway Camp III: Teenage Wasteland (1989), one year later.

Plot
Five years after the events of the first film, a girl named Phoebe, tells a group of boys at a campfire about the killings at Camp Arawak. Her head counselor, Angela, forces her to go back to the cabin. After the pair get into an argument, Angela bashes a log over Phoebe’s head and then removes her tongue for having a "filthy mouth". 

The next day, campers Molly, Ally, Mare, Demi, Lea and sisters Brooke and Jodi, question Angela on the whereabouts of Phoebe. She tells them she had to send her home. Later that day, Angela discovers Brooke and Jodi smoking marijuana and drinking alcohol. She initially let them go only to find them fornicating with one of the boys the next day. Angela chases the boy off. Afterward, Brooke wakes up on a grill and discovers Jodi's charred remains. Angela then pours gasoline over Brooke and burns her to death as well.

That night, the boys start a panty raid which Angela breaks up. During a jock strap raid against the boys Mare flashes her breasts. Angela decides to drive her home and murders her with an electric drill. The next night, campers Anthony and Judd try to scare Angela, dressed as Freddy Krueger and Jason Voorhees. The plan backfires when Angela, dressed as Leatherface (wearing Mare's skinned face as a mask), slashes Anthony's throat and murders Judd with a chainsaw. 

The next day, Angela sets a trap for Ally and forces her down an outhouse, drowning her in human waste and leeches. That night, Demi reveals to Angela that she phoned the families of the campers "sent home" and discovered the girls aren't at home. Realizing she could be caught, Angela strangles Demi with a guitar string, before stabbing Lea to death when she finds Demi's body. 

The next day, head counselors Uncle John and T.C. fire Angela for "sending too many campers home". Molly and Sean go into the woods to cheer her up but the pair discover the bodies of the other campers, before Angela ties them up. After learning the whereabouts of Molly and Sean, T.C. goes after them but Angela throws battery acid in his face, killing him instantly. Sean is decapitated after he realizes Angela is the murderer from the Camp Arawak incident five years ago. 

Later, Angela leaves the cabin and Molly frees herself. Upon returning, Molly knocks Angela out and escapes. After an extended chase through the woods, Molly falls onto a rock and is presumed dead. After killing the remaining campers, Angela hitchhikes but the driver quickly annoys her and she kills her. Molly regains consciousness and makes it out of the woods but the truck pulls up behind her. Molly is horrified to learn that Angela is the driver and she screams.

Cast
Pamela Springsteen as Angela Johnson / Angela Baker
Renée Estevez as Molly Nagle
Tony Higgins as Sean Whitmore (credited as Anthony Higgins)
Valerie Hartman as Ally
Brian Patrick Clarke as T.C.
Walter Gotell as Uncle John
Susan Marie Snyder as Mare
Terry Hobbs as Rob Darrinco
Kendall Bean as Demi
Julie Murphy as Lea
Carol Chambers as Brooke Shote
Amy Fields as Jodi Shote
Benji Wilhoite as Anthony
Walter Franks III as Judd
Justin Nowell as Charlie
Heather Binion as Phoebe
Jason Ehrlich as Emilio
Carol Martin Vines as Diane
Tricia Grant as Girl Sent Home
Jill Jane Clements as Woman in Truck

Production
A YMCA youth camp in Waco, Georgia was used for the fictional Camp Rolling Hills. Filming began on September 20 and wrapped on October 9, 1987.

Releases
Like Sleepaway Camp, Sleepaway Camp II was released theatrically on a limited basis. It was released in theaters on August 26, 1988 before being released on VHS in the United States by Nelson Entertainment two months later.

Home media
The film has been released twice on DVD in the United States by Anchor Bay Entertainment. The first release was in 2002 with a single DVD edition, as well as in the Sleepaway Camp Survival Kit. Both these releases are currently out of print.

Scream Factory, under license from MGM, released Sleepaway Camp II and its sequel, Sleepaway Camp III: Teenage Wasteland, for the first time on Blu-ray disc on June 9, 2015.

In the United Kingdom, the film was released via Futuristic Entertainment, under the title "Nightmare Vacation 2". There was over two minutes of scenes cut from the film in order for it to receive an "18" certificate by the BBFC as the film was deemed too violent for an uncut release. This was due to the strict regime of the time when film distribution had to adhere to rules under the Video Recordings Act 1984. The scenes cut were the removal of Phoebe's tongue, a shortened version of Ally being stabbed in the back, the complete scene where Ally is drowned in the outhouse is removed, and a shortened version of Diane being stabbed in the stomach. This version was also released on DVD from 23rd Century Home Entertainment.

Sleepaway Camp II was eventually released completely uncut in the UK for the first time when it was made available as part of the "Sleepaway Camp Trilogy" DVD box set from Anchor Bay Entertainment on May 31, 2004. It was also available in standard case packaging, both of which are now out of print. The film was released on DVD and Blu-ray by 88 Films as part of their "Slasher Classics Collection" in April 2016.

Reception
On review aggregator website Rotten Tomatoes, Sleepaway Camp II: Unhappy Campers holds a 55% approval rating, based on 11 reviews with an average rating of 4.5 out of 10.

Tim Salmons of The Digital Bits said that "[Blu-ray release of the film] is half of one of the most enjoyable high-definition horror experiences of the year". Brandon Peters of Why So Blu? wrote: "It's unfortunate that the original negative, master what have you has been lost, but I still think the film looks better than it ever has before".

According to William Harrison of DVD Talk, the film is "purposely not scary", adding that "it, instead, ramps up the self-aware humor and ridiculous death scenes".

References

External links
 
 

1988 horror films
1980s comedy horror films
1988 LGBT-related films
1980s serial killer films
Sleepaway Camp 2
1980s teen comedy films
1980s teen horror films
American comedy horror films
American independent films
American sequel films
American serial killer films
American slasher films
American teen comedy films
American teen horror films
American teen LGBT-related films
Films shot in Georgia (U.S. state)
LGBT-related comedy horror films
Sleepaway Camp (film series)
Films about summer camps
Transgender-related films
1988 comedy films
Films set in 1988
1980s English-language films
1980s American films